Andy Horton, an American sailor and Olympic hopeful, is best known for his accomplishments Match racing and Star sailing.

Biography 

Andy began sailing on Lake Champlain in Vermont where he grew up. He went to prep school at Tabor Academy in Marion MA.  After Tabor he attended Hobart college where he studied biology and economics.  In 1998 he graduated from Hobart as a 3 time All American.  After college he has continued to competitively race sail boats.  He has competed in everything from the Americas Cup to Bermuda Races and one design regattas. One of his latest projects was to try to win the right to be the representative to the Olympics in the Star class for the USA.  In the end he did not win the trials, but was the top team for 2 years leading up to the regatta.  The team was named 2006 Team of the Year by US SAILING, the national governing body of sailing in the United States.

Regatta highlights 
 Collegiate All American 1998, 1997, 1996
 Bermuda Race, USA (2001)	1st
 Match Racing World Championship, Italy (2004)	1st
 Match Racing World Championship, Russia (2003)	1st
 America's Cup, Spain (2007)	3rd with Luna Rossa Challenge
LCYC Wednesday Night Series C2 (2019) 1st (as first mate of Slayride)
 Spectator (from Moth) of Slayride’s victory in LCYC Wednesday Series Race B3 (2020)

Star Class
 Star World Championships (2006) 4th
 Pre-Olympic Regatta, China (2006)	1st
 European Championships, Germany (2006)	3rd
 Miami Olympic Classes Regatta (2006)	2nd
 Miami Olympic Classes Regatta (2005) 	1st
 2007 Star North American Champion Vancouver, BC

References

External links 
 Sailing World Article by Andy Horton
 Team Horton Nichol official site
 US SAILING press release: 2006 Athletes of the Year
 Sailing Anarchy "Interview" with Andy and Brad
 Harken.com interview

Year of birth missing (living people)
Living people
American male sailors (sport)
Pan American Games gold medalists for the United States
Sailors at the 1999 Pan American Games
Hobart and William Smith Statesmen and Heron sailors
Pan American Games medalists in sailing
Luna Rossa Challenge sailors
2007 America's Cup sailors
Medalists at the 1999 Pan American Games